The State of Maranhão and Piauí (Portuguese: Estado do Maranhão e Piauí) was one of the states of the Portuguese Empire.

History 
The state was created in 1772 by order of Sebastião José de Carvalho e Melo, 1st Marquis of Pombal, the Secretary of the State for Joseph I of Portugal.

The state was created because of the economic success of the State of Grão-Pará and Maranhão. Sebastião José de Carvalho e Melo split that state into two states, the State of Grão-Pará and Rio Negro and the State of Maranhão and Piauí, thinking that this would cause even better economic conditions, though the state split would prove a failure.

In 1775, due to the failure of the new state, both the State of Grão-Pará and Rio Negro and the State of Maranhão and Piauí were merged into the State of Brazil, finally unifying Portuguese America into one colony.

References

External links

Maranhão and Piauí
Colonial Brazil
Portuguese colonization of the Americas
Former Portuguese colonies
Former subdivisions of Brazil